George Hlazo (born 13 November 1989) is a South African cricketer. He played in one first-class match for Boland in 2014.

See also
 List of Boland representative cricketers

References

External links
 

1989 births
Living people
South African cricketers
Boland cricketers
Place of birth missing (living people)